Chris McNealy may refer to:

 Chris McNealy (basketball, born 1961), American former National Basketball Association player
 Chris McNealy (basketball, born 1992), American basketball player, son of the above